Black Scorpion II: Aftershock, also known as Black Scorpion II: Ground Zero, is a 1997 American superhero comedy television film directed by Jonathan Winfrey, written by Craig J. Nevius, and produced by Roger Corman. It is the sequel to Black Scorpion (1995), and stars Joan Severance, reprising her role as the titular crime-fighting superhero. It aired on Showtime on May 13, 1997.

Darcy Walker is a police detective in Angel City, a fictionalized version of Los Angeles. Her secret identity is the Black Scorpion, a comic book style vigilante. The Black Scorpion does not have any super powers but, like Batman, she fights for justice using a combination of martial arts and advanced technology, including her high-tech car, the Scorpionmobile. The film's exaggerated characters and unrealistic events are portrayed with a humorous camp aesthetic.

The film was followed in 2001 by a Black Scorpion TV series that starred Michelle Lintel in the title role.

Plot
Darcy Walker returns as the Black Scorpion while Angel City is in the midst of a crime wave. When a series of earthquakes shake up the major metropolitan area, seismologist Prof. Undershaft had pioneered groundbreaking technology made to prevent such disasters in the future. But the duplicitous and corrupt Mayor Worth had her life's work sabotaged in order to embezzle tremor insurance, and assigned blame for the fault device ruining the city on her. Now Black Scorpion must protect the city from the vindictive Undershaft, who has become the lethal supervillain femme fatale Aftershock.

Cast
 Joan Severance as Darcy Walker / Black Scorpion
 Whip Hubley as  Rick
 Garrett Morris as Argyle
 Laura Harring as Babette
 Sherrie Rose as Prof. Ursula Undershaft / Aftershock
 Stoney Jackson as Gangster Prankster
 Matt Roe as Mayor Artie Worth
 Stephen Lee as Captain Strickland
 Terri J. Vaughn as Tender Lovin'
 Steven Kravitz as Slugger
 Rick Rossovich as Construction Foreman
 Kenneth Londoner as John

References

External links

Black Scorpion II at Letterbox DVD

1997 films
1997 action comedy films
1990s American films
1990s English-language films
1990s superhero comedy films
1990s vigilante films
Action television films
American comedy television films
American sequel films
American superhero comedy films
American vigilante films
Films about earthquakes
Films directed by Jonathan Winfrey
Films produced by Roger Corman
Films scored by Kevin Kiner
Showtime (TV network) films
Superheroine films
Television sequel films